Alice, I Think is a Canadian television sitcom based on the 2000 Susan Juby book of the same name. Fifteen-year-old Alice is played by Carly McKillip. Alice's brother, MacGregor, is played by Connor Price. Alice's father, John, is played by Dan Payne, and her mother, Diane, is played by Rebecca Northan. Other characters include Marcus, Aubrey, Bob, Finn, Linda, Becky, Karen, Violet, Rosie and Geraldine. The show takes place in Smithers, British Columbia.

The show first aired on The Comedy Network on May 26, 2006. It formerly aired Fridays at 8pm ET/PT and Saturdays at 8:30pm ET/PT on The Comedy Network and aired on A-Channel on Mondays at 8:30pm ET/PT.

External links
 Official Website
 Alice, I Think press release from CTV.ca 
 Achannel.ca
 

CTV Television Network original programming
2006 Canadian television series debuts
2006 Canadian television series endings
2000s Canadian teen sitcoms
CTV 2 original programming
CTV Comedy Channel original programming
Television shows filmed in Vancouver
Television shows set in British Columbia
Television shows based on Canadian novels
Television series about families
Television series about teenagers